Donnermeyer is a surname. Notable people with the surname include:

Joseph Donnermeyer (born 1949), American educator and writer
William I. Donnermeyer Sr. (born 1924), American politician